Soraya Hakuziyaremye is a Rwandan businesswoman, financial management professional and politician who has served as the Cabinet Minister of Trade and Industry in the Rwandan cabinet since 18 October 2018.

Background and education
Hakuziyaremye obtained her high school diploma from Ecole Belge de Kigali (Belgian College of Kigali) where her best subjects were mathematics and physics.

She transferred to Brussels, Belgium, where she studied at Vlerick Business School. Later, she graduated with a Master of Science degree in Finance and Marketing, from the Solvay Business School of Université Libre de Bruxelles. She also holds a Certificate of Advanced Studies in International Management, awarded by the Thunderbird School of Global Management, at Arizona State University, in Phoenix, Arizona in the United States.

Career
For a period of nearly four years, beginning in December 2002, Hakuziyaremye worked at the Bank of New York. She then relocated to Brussels and joined BNP Paribas Fortis, where she spent the next six years.

In June 2012 she went back to Rwanda and spent two and a half years serving as Senior Advisor to the Minister of Foreign Affairs and Cooperation, based in Kigali. After a brief stint in private consulting in Brussels, she was hired by the Dutch financial conglomerate, ING, where she rose to the rank of Vice President, Financial Institutions & Financial Markets Risk Management, based in London, United Kingdom.

In a cabinet reshuffle on 18 October 2018, she was named the cabinet minister of Trade and Industry.

See also
 Germaine Kamayirese
 Espérance Nyirasafari
 Marie-Solange Kayisire

References

External links
 Website of the Rwanda Ministry of Trade and Industry  (Minicom)

Living people
Year of birth missing (living people)
Rwandan women
Rwandan businesspeople
Rwandan politicians
Government ministers of Rwanda
21st-century Rwandan women politicians
21st-century Rwandan politicians
Université libre de Bruxelles alumni
Vlerick Business School alumni
Arizona State University alumni
Women government ministers of Rwanda